Alessandro Vespignani (born April 4, 1965) is an Italian-American physicist, best known for his work on complex networks, and particularly for work on the applications of network theory to the mathematical modeling of infectious disease, applications of computational epidemiology, and for studies of the topological properties of the Internet. He is currently the Sternberg Family Distinguished University Professor of Physics, Computer Science and Health Sciences at Northeastern University, where he is the director of the Network Science Institute.

Vespignani and his team have contributed mathematical and computational modeling analysis on several disease outbreaks, including 2009 H1N1 flu, Ebola epidemic in West Africa, Zika epidemic, and the Covid-19 pandemic.

Vespignani is author, together with Romualdo Pastor-Satorras, of the book Evolution and Structure of the Internet. Together with Alain Barrat and Marc Barthelemy he has published in 2008 the monograph Dynamical Processes on Complex Networks.

Career and research
Vespignani received his undergraduate degree and Ph.D., both in physics and both from the University of Rome “La Sapienza”, in 1990 and 1993, respectively.  Following postdoctoral research at Yale University and Leiden University, he worked at the International Centre for Theoretical Physics in Trieste for five years, and briefly at the University of Paris-Sud, before moving to Indiana University in 2004, and then to Northeastern University in 2011.

Vespignani has worked in a number of areas of physics, including characterization of non-equilibrium phenomena and phase transitions, computer science, network science and computational epidemiology. He has collaborated with, among others, Luciano Pietronero, Benoit Mandelbrot, Betz Halloran, Ira Longini, and David Lazer. He describes his current research as being focused on "interdisciplinary application of statistical and numerical simulation methods in the analysis of epidemic and spreading phenomena and the study of biological, social and technological networks."

He is best known, however, for his work on complex networks.  Of particular note is his work with Romualdo Pastor-Satorras, in which the two demonstrated that for a disease propagating on a random scale-free network the transmission probability or infectivity necessary to sustain an outbreak tends to zero in the limit of large network size. Vespignani’s works on modeling the spatial spread of epidemics includes the realistic and data-driven modeling of emerging infectious diseases, and contributions to computational epidemiology by developing specific tools for the analysis of the global spread of epidemics.

During the COVID-19 pandemic, Vespignani’s team investigated how travel and quarantine influenced the dynamics of the spread of SARS-CoV-2. The modeling analysis mapped the early dispersal of infections and the temporal windows of the introduction of SARS-CoV-2 and onset of local transmission in Europe and the USA, showing that hidden outbreaks were spreading almost completely undetected in major US cities. Vespignani research contributed also to covid forecasting and scenario analysis.

Honors 
Vespignani is a fellow of the  American Physical Society and the Network Science Society. He has been inducted in the Academia Europaea (section Physics and Engineering) in 2011.

 Aspen Institute Italia Award for scientific research and collaboration between Italy and the United States, 2016
 Doctorate Honoris Causa from Delft University of Technology in the Netherlands, 2017 
 John Graunt award for extraordinary achievements in one of the population sciences, 2018 
 Senior Scientific award of the Complex Systems Society for outstanding contributions to Complex Systems & Network sciences, 2108 
 Premio Nazionale di Divulgazione Scientifica, Associazione Italiana del Libro, 2019
 Euler Award, Network Science Society, 2020
 Knight: Order of the star of Italy: 9 December 2020

Notable publications
 
 
 

 
 
 Tizzoni, M., Bajardi, P., Poletto, C., Ramasco, J.J., Balcan, D., Goncalves, B., Perra, N., Colizza, V., Vespignani, A.,  Real-time numerical forecast of global epidemic spreading: case study of 2009 A/H1N1pdm. BMC Med 10, 165 (2012). https://doi.org/10.1186/1741-7015-10-165. 
 
 
 Piontti, A. P., Perra, N., Rossi, L., Samay, N., & Vespignani, A. (2019). Charting the next pandemic: modeling infectious disease spreading in the data science age. Heidelberg: Springer.

References

20th-century Italian physicists
Complex systems scientists
Indiana University faculty
Academic staff of Paris-Sud University
Sapienza University of Rome alumni
Living people
1965 births
Northeastern University faculty
Yale University fellows
Network scientists
Fellows of the American Physical Society